is a railway station on the Kagoshima Main Line, operated by JR Kyushu in Chikugo, Fukuoka Prefecture, Japan.

Lines 

Layout 
The station, which is unstaffed, consists of two opposed side platforms serving two tracks at grade. The station building is a modern prefabricated structure and houses a small waiting area, an automatic ticket vending machine, and Sugoca card readers. Access to the opposite side platform is by means of a footbridge. The elevated tracks of the Kyushu Shinkansen run next to platform 2, parallel with the tracks.

Adjacent stations

History
The station was opened by Japanese Government Railways (JGR) on 17 May 1937 as an additional station on the existing Kagoshima Main Line track. With the privatization of Japanese National Railways (JNR), the successor of JGR, on 1 April 1987, JR Kyushu took over control of the station. The station became unstaffed in 2016.

Passenger statistics
In fiscal 2016, the station was used by an average of 430 passengers daily (boarding passengers only), and it ranked 258th among the busiest stations of JR Kyushu.

References

External links
Nishimuta Station (JR Kyushu)

Railway stations in Fukuoka Prefecture
Railway stations in Japan opened in 1937